Woodburn, also known as Mundy House, is a historic home and farm complex located near Charlottesville, Albemarle County, Virginia.  The original section of the house, built about 1821, consists of a two-story, brick hall and parlor plan Federal style dwelling. It has one-story frame additions to the rear and a skillfully attached -story frame wing built in 1983. Also on the property is the Mundy family cemetery.

It was added to the National Register of Historic Places in 2000.

References

Houses on the National Register of Historic Places in Virginia
Federal architecture in Virginia
Houses completed in 1821
Houses in Albemarle County, Virginia
National Register of Historic Places in Albemarle County, Virginia